Djalma Braume Manuel Abel Campos (born 30 May 1987), known simply as Djalma, is an Angolan professional footballer who plays as a forward for Portuguese club C.D. Trofense.

Djalma played most of his career in Portugal, starting with Marítimo with which he remained five seasons. In 2011 he signed with Porto, and also spent several years in the Turkish Süper Lig.

An international since 2008, Djalma represented Angola in four Africa Cup of Nations tournaments.

Club career
The son of Abel Campos, a winger who played several seasons in Portugal, including with S.L. Benfica and S.C. Braga, Djalma was born in Luanda and played his youth football in the Lisbon Region. In summer 2006 he signed with C.S. Marítimo in the Primeira Liga, his only appearance of the season being on 5 May 2007 in a 0–0 home draw against Académica de Coimbra where he featured 12 minutes.

Djalma became an important first-team member for the Madeirans from 2008–09 onwards – even though he played his last game for the reserves in 2010 – scoring six goals in 28 matches in the 2009–10 campaign and forming an efficient attacking partnership with Senegalese Baba Diawara. On 25 October 2009, he netted twice in a 3–1 home win over F.C. Paços de Ferreira.

On 2 May 2011, Djalma signed a five-year contract with FC Porto. A reserve player in his first year, he appeared in 19 official games to help the northerners win the national championship, scoring his only league goal (three in total) in the last round at Rio Ave FC, a 5–2 victory. His maiden appearance in the UEFA Champions League took place on 13 September 2011, when he featured 22 minutes in the 2–1 home defeat of FC Shakhtar Donetsk in the group stage.

From 2012 to 2016, Djalma represented Kasımpaşa SK, Konyaspor and Gençlerbirliği SK, with all clubs competing in the Turkish Süper Lig. On 14 June 2016 he joined PAOK FC in the Super League Greece, on a three-year contract and a €800,000 salary per season. He scored his first goals for his new team on 17 December, a brace in the 5–0 away win against PAE Kerkyra, and added four matches in that season's Greek Cup to help them win the trophy for the fifth time.

On 28 June 2018, after helping PAOK retain their supremacy in the domestic cup while scoring seven goals across all competitions, Djalma returned to the Turkish top division after agreeing to a three-year contract at Alanyaspor for a €1 million fee.

International career
Djalma received his first call-up to the Angola national team in 2008. Following several successful displays for Marítimo, he was selected for the squads at both the 2010 and the 2012 Africa Cup of Nations.

Djalma scored his first international goal against Malta in October 2009, in a 2–1 friendly win. His second came in a 2014 FIFA World Cup qualifier against Uganda, on 3 June 2012.

International goals
Angola score listed first, score column indicates score after each Djalma goal.

Honours
Porto
Primeira Liga: 2011–12

PAOK
Greek Football Cup: 2016–17, 2017–18

References

External links

1987 births
Living people
Footballers from Luanda
Angolan footballers
Association football forwards
Primeira Liga players
Liga Portugal 2 players
Segunda Divisão players
C.S. Marítimo players
FC Porto players
S.C. Farense players
C.D. Trofense players
Süper Lig players
Kasımpaşa S.K. footballers
Konyaspor footballers
Gençlerbirliği S.K. footballers
Alanyaspor footballers
Super League Greece players
PAOK FC players
Angola international footballers
2010 Africa Cup of Nations players
2012 Africa Cup of Nations players
2013 Africa Cup of Nations players
2019 Africa Cup of Nations players
Angolan expatriate footballers
Expatriate footballers in Portugal
Expatriate footballers in Turkey
Expatriate footballers in Greece
Angolan expatriate sportspeople in Portugal
Angolan expatriate sportspeople in Turkey
Angolan expatriate sportspeople in Greece